Balbal or bal-bal can refer to:
 Balbals or Kurgan stelae
 Bal-Bal - in Philippine mythology, a Bal-Bal is an undead monster that steals corpses.